Isabel Cristina P. L. Bento Martins  is a former politician in Ontario, Canada. She was a Liberal member of the Legislative Assembly of Ontario from 2014 to 2018 who represented the downtown Toronto riding of Davenport.

Background
She emigrated with her family from Portugal in 1970. Prior to her election, she worked almost 15 years in the pharmaceutical industry.

Politics
Martins ran in the 2011 provincial election as the Liberal candidate in the riding of Davenport. She was defeated by New Democratic Party candidate Jonah Schein by 1,414 votes. She ran again in the 2014 election this time defeating Schein by 2,041 votes.

She was Parliamentary Assistant to the Minister of Citizenship, Immigration and International Trade.

Election results

References

External links
Profile at the Ontario Legislature

21st-century Canadian politicians
21st-century Canadian women politicians
Living people
Ontario Liberal Party MPPs
Politicians from Toronto
Portuguese emigrants to Canada
Women MPPs in Ontario
Year of birth missing (living people)
Canadian people of Portuguese descent